WIZM-FM (93.3 MHz) is a radio station  broadcasting a Top 40/CHR format. Licensed to La Crosse, Wisconsin, United States, the station serves the La Crosse area. The station is currently owned by Mid-West Family Broadcasting.

WIZM-FM is the Local Primary-1 (LP-1) station for the Emergency Alert System for La Crosse and throughout the Southwest Region of the state.

Emergency Alert System incident
In 2013 shortly after the Emergency Alert System Zombie Attack incident in 3 states, One of WIZM-FM's on-air personalities accidentally triggered the EAS on its local CBS station WKBT-DT by airing a recording of the false Zombie Attack message during its morning show. During the show shortly after the incident, the hosts' laughter was heard in the audio relayed. But it was relayed in an accidental false alarm.

References

External links
Z93.3 official website

IZM-FM
Contemporary hit radio stations in the United States
Radio stations established in 1975